Abe Lord Creek is a  long 1st order tributary to the Delaware River in Delaware County, New York.

Course
Abe Lord Creek rises in a pond about 1 mile west of French Woods in Delaware County, New York on the East Branch Delaware River divide.  Abe Lord Creek then flows south to meet the Delaware River about 0.5 miles east of Lordville, New York.

Watershed
Abe Lord Creek drains  of area, receives about 45.3 in/year of precipitation, has a topographic wetness index of 364.43 and is about 88.9% forested.

Maps

References

Rivers of New York (state)
Rivers of Delaware County, New York